The 2nd Royal Bavarian Chevau-légers "Taxis" (2. Königlich Bayerisches Chevaulegers-Regiment „Taxis“) were a light cavalry regiment of the Royal Bavarian Army. The regiment was formed in 1682 and disbanded in 1919. After the First World War the regiment's traditions were carried on by the 3rd squadron of the 17th (Bavarian) Reiter Regiment, and during the Third Reich by the 25th Panzer Regiment.

See also
List of Imperial German cavalry regiments

References

Cavalry regiments of the Bavarian Army
Regiments of the German Army in World War I
Military units and formations established in 1682
Military units and formations disestablished in 1919